Distant Memories – Live in London is the ninth live album and video by progressive metal band Dream Theater. Recorded on February 21 and 22, 2020, at the Hammersmith Eventim Apollo Theatre during their Distance over Time Tour, the setlist consists primarily of songs from the bands then current album Distance over Time in the first half, followed by a complete performance of the 1999 album Metropolis Pt. 2: Scenes from a Memory, celebrating its 20th anniversary. This marks the second full performance of this record captured on a live album, following 2001's Live Scenes from New York.

The album was released in a number of formats, including CD, DVD, Blu-ray, and Vinyl and combinations thereof.

Track listing

Disc 1

 "Untethered Angel" (Petrucci) – 5:55
 "A Nightmare to Remember" (Petrucci) – 16:37
 "Fall Into the Light" (Myung) – 7:26
 "Barstool Warrior" (Petrucci) – 6:42
 "In the Presence of Enemies – Part 1" (Petrucci) – 8:43
 "Pale Blue Dot" (Petrucci) – 8:52

Disc 2

 "Scenes Live Intro" – 1:44
 "Scene One: Regression" (Petrucci) – 2:06
 "Scene Two: I. Overture 1928" (instrumental) – 3:38
 "Scene Two: II. Strange Déjà Vu" (Portnoy) – 5:03
 "Scene Three: I. Through My Words" (Petrucci) – 1:02
 "Scene Three: II. Fatal Tragedy" (Myung) – 6:53
 "Scene Four: Beyond This Life" (Petrucci) – 11:26
 "Scene Five: Through Her Eyes" (Petrucci) – 6:45

Disc 3

 "Scene Six: Home" (Portnoy) – 13:01
 "Scene Seven: I. The Dance of Eternity" (instrumental) – 6:09
 "Scene Seven: II. One Last Time" (LaBrie) – 3:48
 "Scene Eight: The Spirit Carries On" (Petrucci) – 6:39
 "Scene Nine: Finally Free" (Portnoy) – 12:54
 "At Wit's End" (LaBrie) – 9:42
 "Paralyzed" (Petrucci) – 4:34 (bonus track)

Personnel
Mike Mangini – drums, percussion
James LaBrie – vocals
John Petrucci – guitars, backing vocals
John Myung – bass
Jordan Rudess – keyboards

Charts

References

2020 live albums
Dream Theater video albums
Dream Theater live albums